Cypress Hills is a provincial electoral district for the Legislative Assembly of Saskatchewan, Canada. Located in the extreme southwest corner of the province, this constituency was formed by the Representation Act, 1994 (Saskatchewan) through combining the districts of Shaunavon, Maple Creek, and portions of Swift Current.

The district has an economy based on agriculture, cattle ranching and major oil and gas production. The constituency also contains the Great Sand Hills in its northern areas and Cypress Hills Interprovincial Park. A near-complete Tyrannosaurus rex skeleton – one of only 12 in the world – was found near the town of Eastend.

The largest communities include Maple Creek and Shaunavon with populations of 2,270 and 1,775 respectively. Smaller centers in the district include the towns of Gull Lake, Leader, Cabri, Eastend and Burstall; and the villages of Frontier, Fox Valley, Tompkins, Alsask, Abbey, Webb and Consul.

An electoral district in the same area called "Cypress" existed from 1917 until 1934.

Members of the Legislative Assembly

Election results 

|-

 
|NDP
|Alex Mortensen
|align="right"|757
|align="right"|12.35
|align="right"|-3.61

|- bgcolor="white"
!align="left" colspan=3|Total
!align="right"|6,128
!align="right"|100.00
!align="right"|

|-

 
|NDP
|Jason Hicks
|align="right"|1,129
|align="right"|15.96
|align="right"|-4.85
 
|Liberal
|Josh Haugerud
|align="right"|321
|align="right"|4.54
|align="right"|-9.23

|- bgcolor="white"
!align="left" colspan=3|Total
!align="right"|7,075
!align="right"|100.00
!align="right"|

|-

 
|NDP
|Eric August
|align="right"|1,418
|align="right"|20.81
|align="right"|+0.09
 
|Liberal
|Barry Thienes
|align="right"|938
|align="right"|13.77
|align="right"|-2.84
|- bgcolor="white"
!align="left" colspan=3|Total
!align="right"|6,814
!align="right"|100.00
!align="right"|

|-

 
|NDP
|Keith Murch
|align="right"|1,368
|align="right"|20.72
|align="right"|-1.42
 
|Liberal
|Barry Thienes
|align="right"|1,097
|align="right"|16.61
|align="right"|-9.69
|- bgcolor="white"
!align="left" colspan=3|Total
!align="right"|6,603
!align="right"|100.00
!align="right"|

|-

 
|Liberal
|Barry Thienes
|align="right"|1,509
|align="right"|26.30
|align="right"|-10.10
 
|NDP
|Keith Murch
|align="right"|1,270
|align="right"|22.14
|align="right"|-3.15
|- bgcolor="white"
!align="left" colspan=3|Total
!align="right"|5,737
!align="right"|100.00
!align="right"|

|-
 
| style="width: 130px" |Prog. Conservative
|Jack Goohsen
|align="right"|2,863
|align="right"|38.31
|align="right"|–
 
|Liberal
|Barry Thienes
|align="right"|2,720
|align="right"|36.40
|align="right"|–
 
|NDP
|Carl Wenaas
|align="right"|1,890
|align="right"|25.29
|align="right"|–
|- bgcolor="white"
!align="left" colspan=3|Total
!align="right"|7,473
!align="right"|100.00
!align="right"|

References

External links 
Website of the Legislative Assembly of Saskatchewan
Saskatchewan Archives Board – Saskatchewan Election Results By Electoral District

Saskatchewan provincial electoral districts